Kuangqu is a district of Yangquan, Shanxi province, China.

References
www.xzqh.org 

County-level divisions of Shanxi
Yangquan